Notovoluta is a genus of sea snails, marine gastropod mollusks in the family Volutidae.

Species
Species within the genus Notovoluta include:

 Notovoluta baconi Wilson, 1972
 Notovoluta capricornea (Wilson, 1972)
 Notovoluta gardneri Darragh, 1983
 Notovoluta gerondiosi Bail & Limpus, 2005
 Notovoluta hoskensae Poppe, 1992
 Notovoluta kreuslerae (Angas, 1865)
 Notovoluta norwestralis Bail & Limpus, 2003
 Notovoluta occidua Cotton, 1946
 Notovoluta pseudolirata (Tate, 1888)
 Notovoluta verconis (Tate, 1892)

References

External links

Volutidae